GT Academy (also known as Nissan PlayStation GT Academy and NISMO PlayStation GT Academy as part of the Nissan partnership) was a television programme run by Nissan and Sony Interactive Entertainment, which provided an alternative route into real-life motorsport. GT Academy provided Gran Turismo gamers the chance to go from virtual to reality, from their PlayStation to a real-life professional racing career with Nissan.

History
In 2006, Nissan Europe general manager Darren Cox made a promotional deal with Sony Computer Entertainment UK that brought fans of PlayStation driving games for a day of driving in Nissan cars. One of the instructors described the driving skills of some fans as having a clear impression on the circuit. Nissan and Sony recognized the value of the concept, and GT Academy launched two years later. The programme was originally intended to run for only a year, but the series continued for seven more years from 2010 to its conclusion in 2016.

At its inception, GT Academy received skepticism from critics, as a programme taking gamers and training them into legitimate racing drivers had not been attempted prior. Autoblog described GT Academy as "either the stupidest idea ever or the most brilliant co-promotion for two brands."

The inaugural year of GT Academy commenced in 2008, attracting 25,000 gamers from across 12 participating countries in Europe who entered through the Gran Turismo 5 game on PlayStation 3. Spaniard Lucas Ordoñez became the inaugural winner, and earned a spot in RJN Motorsport's entry for the 2009 Dubai 24 Hour. His efforts at the Dubai 24 Hours in 2009, racing alongside former Formula One driver Johnny Herbert, prompted Nissan to sign Ordoñez for a full season in the 2009 GT4 European Cup, where he finished the season in second place with two wins and six podiums.

GT Academy continued in 2010, expanding to 17 countries, including New Zealand and Australia. A GT Academy-oriented DLC for Gran Turismo 5 was released to the public, and was the prerequisite required for participants to qualify for the programme. The DLC was downloaded by participants more than 1.3 million times during its active period. In 2011, the competition expanded to the United States, where Bryan Heitkotter became the first GT Academy Winner outside of Europe. The European competition in 2011 began at the 24 Hours of Le Mans in Le Mans, France, as inaugural GT Academy Winner Lucas Ordoñez made his Le Mans race debut. 2012 saw the beginning of live events, offering a way into GT Academy for those without access to a PlayStation 3 console or Gran Turismo game. 

In 2013, GT Academy included competitions in Europe, the United States, Germany, Russia, the Middle East and South Africa, each entering the competition for the first time on Gran Turismo 6. In 2014, a new International competition was introduced, broadening GT Academy again to Australia and the Middle East, and for the first time to India, Mexico, and Thailand. The sixth season in 2014 grew to include separate competitions for Europe (France, Italy, United Kingdom, Spain, Portugal, Belgium, Netherlands, Luxembourg, Russia, Sweden, Poland, and Czech Republic), Germany, North America (United States and Canada) and an International group (Australia, India, Middle East, Mexico and Thailand). In the 2015 Dubai 24 Hour race, four new GT Academy winners finished second in the GT3 Pro-Am class and fifth overall out of 95 cars, just months after winning their respective GT Academy competitions. The round in Malaysia was planned in 2015, together with new countries such as Japan and Indonesia.

Format
The contest comprised different phases. Players began with virtual racing on Polyphony Digital's Gran Turismo games and progressed to National Finals before the winners of each region competed for real in actual Nissan cars at Race Camp. This experience involved week-long testing and challenges that also involved elimination. Throughout all seasons of the programme, 'Race Camp' was based at Silverstone Circuit in the United Kingdom where the winner was crowned to whoever demonstrated the highest potential to transition from Gran Turismo gamer to a real racer. Nissan's Driver Development Program was included to try and assist GT Academy winners to develop the skills needed to compete against those with years of car racing experience. Over six seasons, more than five million people had entered GT Academy via PlayStation 3. GT Academy winners who qualified to compete in the international race or series were also considered for a potential future racing career with Nissan as a Nismo Athlete.

Entrance requirements 
According to the GT Academy site on the Gran Turismo website, GT Academy required entrants to be over the age of 18 and hold a valid driver's license, and never have a racing license equivalent to Motor Sport Association UK A class license or higher. Any contestant who made it to Race Camp in any of the previous GT Academy competitions was generally restricted to the Online Qualification stage of the GT Academy.

Phase one: Qualification
Players qualified for GT Academy through Gran Turismo 6 on PlayStation 3. Gamers in the participating territories signed in with their PSN (PlayStation Network) ID and entered the competition via a free automatic update on the game. They then had to compete against each other to set the fastest lap time possible in four consecutive rounds, each with a different track and Nissan vehicle, before the final round determined whether or not the player qualified for the next phase of GT Academy.

Nissan and PlayStation hosted Live Events for the qualifying rounds in the participating territories. These events allowed those who did not have a PlayStation 3 or copy of Gran Turismo 6 to enter the competition on gaming pods set up at public venues or events, such as motor shows and gaming conventions. The fastest gamers at the Live Events were granted a spot at the National Finals.

Phase two: National Finals
National Finals identified which gamers had real-life racing potential and determined the top selection of competitors who would progress to the next phase of GT Academy. In addition to onsite Gran Turismo 6 time trials, competitors were also tested on real driving in Nissan vehicles. Additionally, players underwent a personality test, and regular assessments of physical fitness, vision and general health.

Phase three: Race Camp
Winners from the National Finals received a place at Race Camp, a week-long selection process that determined the GT Academy Winner. Headquartered at Stowe Circuit in the premises of Silverstone Circuit, UK, Race Camp assessed competitors both on and off the real-world track. Competitors were split into regional groups where they competed against each other and also against other territories. They were allocated a judge - each with a professional background in auto racing – responsible for mentoring and eliminating all but one of their group based on various eliminatory challenges. A head judge also oversaw the eliminations and had the ultimate responsibility of naming the GT Academy Winner. On the last day, the remaining competitors - one from each group – competed in a final race against each other, where the results of the race, along with their development over Race Camp, were taken into account, so as for the judges to determine the winner.

All activities took place within Silverstone Circuit and a number of other neighbouring venues to accommodate numerous types of challenges. On the track, these included pit stop challenge, gymkhana, dogfight, stock car racing, traffic challenge, and more, with competitors driving in buggies, single seaters, and Caterham cars, as well as actual Nissan cars such as the 370Z, Juke, GT-R, Leaf, and Pulsar. Off-track challenges typically involved an assault course, triathlon, laser challenge, written tests, interviews and more.

Phase four: Driver Development Program
GT Academy Winners were invited to take part in Nissan's Driver Development Programme. Headquartered at Silverstone Circuit, UK, the Driver Development Program consisted of two-to-four months of training and racing at club and national level with the GT Academy Nissan RJN Motorsport Team in order for drivers to qualify for an International Racing License, a process that normally takes three years. This was a requirement to compete at an international endurance race – the final prize for the majority of the GT Academy Winners – which for most had been the Dubai 24 Hours. rFactor 2 is also used for the training.

RJN Motorsport was the racing team for GT Academy Winners for the Driver Development Programme for the entirety of GT Academy, starting from when inaugural winner Lucas Ordoñez upgraded his National B racing license to an International C racing licence after six weekends of racing.

In addition to building fitness, racing experience and theory, the Driver Development Programme also included training in the NISMO Lab, where technological equipment included Nissan's In-Body machine, which analysed body composition; a brainwave monitor, which trained the mind to simultaneously focus and relax; a BATAK console to improve peripheral vision and reaction times; a racing simulator which allowed simulated racing practice on any track in the world; a biometric harness and the JukeRide which measured biometric and telemetry data respectively.

Competitions 
For 2015, there were three GT Academy competitions based on region. These were:
 GT Academy Europe: France, Italy, Germany, UK, Iberia (Spain, Portugal), Benelux (Belgium, Netherlands) and CEE (Poland, Czech Republic, Hungary)
 GT Academy Asia: Japan, India, Thailand, Philippines, Indonesia
 GT Academy International: USA, Australia, Mexico, Egypt, Morocco, Algeria , Turkey

Graduates 
GT Academy has turned video gamers to racing drivers over a period of months, and NISMO Athletes have competed at international car racing competitions since 2009.

At the 24 Hours of Le Mans, Lucas Ordoñez finished second in the LM P2 category in 2011 and in 2013 finished third alongside Jann Mardenborough (2011 European winner). In 2014, Wolfgang Reip recorded the first-ever all-electric lap of the Le Mans circuit, driving the Nissan ZEOD RC.

In the Blancpain Endurance Series, Jordan Tresson was winner of the GT4 class in 2011. In 2013, the Pro-Am cup was won by Lucas Ordoñez, while the Pro-Am team cup was won by Nissan GT Academy Team RJN, which included Jann Mardenborough, Wolfgang Reip (2012 European winner), Mark Shulzhitskiy (2012 Russia winner), Peter Pyzera (2012 Germany winner) and Steve Doherty (2012 USA winner). In 2015, Reip became a joint Drivers' Championship Pro Cup winner.

GT Academy Winners have also competed in the Dubai 24 Hours, FIA GT Series, FIA World Endurance Championship, British GT Championship, FIA Formula 3 European Championships, British Formula Three Championship, TRS Single-Seater Series, IMSA Continental Tire Sports Car Challenge, SCCA Solo National Championship and the United SportsCar Championship. In 2012, Lucas Ordoñez competed at the Petit Le Mans in the Nissan DeltaWing race car, and in 2014 began racing in the Super GT Series, class GT300, with NDDP Racing. In the same year, Jann Mardenborough began racing in the GP3 Series with Arden International, and at Motorland Aragon raced for the first time in a Formula Renault 3.5 test. In September 2014, Nissan announced that former US GT Academy Winners and finalists would be considered for Nissan's new LM P1 Le Mans 24 Hours and FIA World Endurance Championship Team.

On 8 February 2015, GT Academy graduates Wolfgang Reip (2012) and Florian Strauss (2013) teamed with Super GT driver Katsumasa Chiyo to compete in the Bathurst 12 Hour at the famous Mount Panorama Circuit in Australia. Driving a Nissan GT-R Nismo GT3 for the NISMO Athlete Global Team in the Class AA, they completed 269 laps to claim the overall race win.

Mardenborough's achievements since winning GT Academy saw him named as one of the 50 most marketable athletes in the world by Sports Pro Media in 2015.

In 2016, Nicolas Hammann became the first GT Academy graduate to compete in stock car racing (both Gran Turismo 5 and Gran Turismo 6 had featured NASCAR Cup Series cars), where he made two starts (all on road courses) for Mike Harmon Racing in the NASCAR Xfinity Series. Hammann made further road course starts in the Xfinity Series in 2017 and 2019.

Recognition 
 2013 AUTOSPORT Awards, Pioneering and Innovation Award
 2012 Cannes Lions International Festival of Creativity, Bronze Lion, Best Use of Branded Content
 2011 Cannes Lions International Festival of Creativity, Gold Lion, Best Use of Branded Content
 2011 ‘Campaign’ magazine Media Awards, Best Transport Campaign
 2011 ‘Campaign’ magazine Media Awards, Best Media and Entertainment Campaign
 2011 Media Week Awards, Best International Campaign

See also 
:Category:GT Academy participants

References

External links

Defunct esports competitions
Gran Turismo (series)
Nissan in motorsport
2008 British television series debuts
British reality television series
ITV reality television shows
Spanish reality television series
Russian reality television series
German reality television series